Bandun-e Olya (also Romanized as Bandūn-e ‘Olyā; also known as Bandūn, Deh Bāndūn, Deh-e Bandān, and Deh-e Bandūn) is a village in Barez Rural District, Manj District, Lordegan County, Chaharmahal and Bakhtiari Province, Iran. At the 2006 census, its population was 73, in 15 families.

References 

Populated places in Lordegan County